Edward Thomas Scott Reid (12 December 1871 – 27 July 1938) was a Scottish Anglican bishop who ministered in the Scottish Episcopal Church.

Early life and education
Reid was born on 12 December 1871 and educated at Fettes College, the University of Edinburgh, the University of Glasgow (Master of Arts 1895, Doctor of Divinity 1922) and the Edinburgh Theological College (1895).

Ordained ministry
Reid was ordained deacon in 1897 and priest in 1899. His first post was a curacy at Old Saint Paul's, Edinburgh after which, in 1900, he became curate at St Mary's Cathedral, Edinburgh, and in 1901 Second Chaplain of the same cathedral. Later, in 1903, he became Rector of St Cuthbert's, Hawick, and then of St Bride's Church in Glasgow in 1910. In 1920 he was appointed  Dean of Glasgow and Galloway.

Bishop
Reid was elected Bishop of Glasgow and Galloway in 1921 and was consecrated on 24 June 1921 at St Mary's Cathedral, Glasgow, by Walter Robberds. In 1931 he was translated to St Andrews, Dunkeld and Dunblane and died in post on 27 July 1938.

Notes

1871 births
People educated at Fettes College
Alumni of the University of Edinburgh
Deans of Glasgow and Galloway
Bishops of Glasgow and Galloway
Bishops of Saint Andrews, Dunkeld and Dunblane
20th-century Scottish Episcopalian bishops
1938 deaths